The Lietuvos krepšinio lyga (LKL) Finals is the championship finals series for the top-tier level professional club basketball league in Lithuania, the LKL, and the conclusion of the league's postseason. The Finals have been played in either a best-of-seven, or a best-of five format. The first LKL Finals series was held in 1994, and was contested by Žalgiris and Atletas, with Žalgiris winning the series 3–1.

Žalgiris Kaunas has been the most successful team, having won 22 out of the 27 LKL Finals series that have been played so far. Lietuvos rytas Vilnius is the only other team to win the LKL Finals.

History

1994–2000: Early dominance by Žalgiris Kaunas
Žalgiris Kaunas won the first 6 LKL Finals series, from 1994 to 1999. The team's dominance in the LKL Finals came to an end in the 2000 LKL Finals, when they lost to Lietuvos rytas Vilnius. During that same period, Žalgiris had also won the second tier level European-wide FIBA Saporta Cup in the 1997–98 season, and the first tier level European-wide 1999 FIBA EuroLeague Final Four. From 1994 to 2000, Atletas Kaunas was the only other club that came close to winning the LKL Finals, as they won the first two games of the 5 game 1996 LKL Finals.

2000–2010: Lietuvos rytas Vilnius and Žalgiris rivalry
Lietuvos rytas Vilnius finally ended Žalgiris Kaunas' run of winning the first 6 LKL Finals, when they won the finals in 2000. Over an 11-year period, from 2000 to 2010, all of the LKL Finals were won by the two clubs, with Lietuvos rytas winning 5 LKL Finals series, and Žalgiris Kaunas winning 6 LKL Finals series.

2011–present: Žalgiris Kaunas again dominates
Starting with the 2011 LKL Finals, Žalgiris Kaunas began another long run of dominance, winning 10 straight LKL Finals series, from 2011 to 2021.

LKL Finals series results

LKL Finals won by head coach

List of winning head coaches:

 1994 – Jaak Salumets
 1995 – Jonas Kazlauskas
 1996 – Jonas Kazlauskas (2)
 1997 – Jonas Kazlauskas (3)
 1998 – Jonas Kazlauskas (4)
 1999 – Jonas Kazlauskas (5)
 2000 – Šarūnas Sakalauskas
 2001 – Algirdas Brazys
 2002 – Jonas Kazlauskas (6)
 2003 – Antanas Sireika
 2004 – Antanas Sireika (2)
 2005 – Antanas Sireika (3)
 2006 – Neven Spahija
 2007 – Rimantas Grigas
 2008 – Rimantas Grigas (2)
 2009 – Rimas Kurtinaitis
 2010 – Rimas Kurtinaitis (2)
 2011 – Ilias Zouros
 2012 – Aleksandar Trifunović
 2013 – Joan Plaza
 2014 – Gintaras Krapikas
 2015 – Gintaras Krapikas (2)
 2016 – Šarūnas Jasikevičius
 2017 – Šarūnas Jasikevičius (2)
 2018 – Šarūnas Jasikevičius (3)
 2019 – Šarūnas Jasikevičius (4)
 2020 – Finals were not held
 2021 – Martin Schiller
 2022 – Giedrius Žibėnas

LKL Finals Most Valuable Player

The LKL Finals Most Valuable Player Award is the annual award that is given by the professional Lithuanian Basketball League (LKL), to the Most Valuable Player of each season's LKL Finals.

Gintaras Einikis was the winner of the first Finals MVP award, in 1994. So far 5 players, Einikis, Arvydas Macijauskas, Tanoka Beard, Paulius Jankūnas and Edgaras Ulanovas, have won multiple Finals MVP awards. To date, Beard is the only non-Lithuanian player to win multiple Finals MVP awards. The current holder of the award is Arnas Butkevičius.

LKL Finals MVPs

Player nationality by national team:

Multi-time winners

By player nationality

By club

See also
LKL
LKL MVP
LKL Finals
LKL Finals MVP
King Mindaugas Cup
King Mindaugas Cup MVP
LKF Cup
List of Lithuanian basketball league champions
Basketball in Lithuania

References

External links 
 Official LKL website
 Official LKL YouTube.com channel
 Lithuanian league at Eurobasket.com

MVP
Lietuvos krepšinio lyga lists
Finals